Pseudohemihyalea ambigua, the red-banded aemilia, is a moth of the family Erebidae. It is found from southern Wyoming to Durango, Mexico.

The length of the forewings is  about 24 mm for females and 22 mm in males. Adults are on wing from June to August.

The larvae feed on Pinus ponderosa.

External links
  (2009): Revision of the "Aemilia" ambigua (Strecker) species-group (Noctuidae, Arctiinae). ZooKeys 9: 63-78.  PDF fulltext

Moths described in 1885
ambigua